Mount Batur (Gunung Batur) is an active volcano located at the center of two concentric calderas north west of Mount Agung on the island of Bali, Indonesia. The south east side of the larger 10×13 km caldera contains a caldera lake. Both the larger caldera, and a smaller 7.5 km caldera were formed by a collapse of the magma chamber, the first larger collapse taking place about 29,300 years ago, and the second inner caldera collapsing about 20,150 years ago. Another estimate of the inner caldera's formation date, formed during emplacement of the Bali (or Ubud) ignimbrite, has been dated at about 23,670 and 28,500 years ago.

The first documented eruption was in 1804 and the most recent was in 2000.

Active volcano and Lake Batur in the caldera

The eruption that brought this volcano to be visible above the ocean is one of the most forceful across the Earth. This volcano is marked by a collapsed top, called a caldera.

The southeast wall of the inner caldera lies beneath Lake Batur; Batur cone has been constructed within the inner caldera to a height above the outer caldera rim. The Batur stratovolcano has produced vents over much of the inner caldera, but a NE-SW fissure system has localized the Batur I, II, and III craters along the summit ridge. Historical eruptions have been characterized by mild-to-moderate explosive activity sometimes accompanied by lava emission. Basaltic lava flows from both summit and flank vents have reached the caldera floor and the shores of Lake Batur over its history.

The caldera contains an active, 700-metre-tall stratovolcano rising above the surface of Lake Batur. The first documented eruption of Batur was in 1804, and it has been frequently active since then, most recently in 2000. The substantial lava field from the 1968 eruption is visible today when viewed from Kintamani, a town on the southwest ridge of the caldera.

Villages in the caldera
The caldera is populated and includes the four main villages of Kedisan, Songan, Trunyan and Toya Bungkah, among a total of 15 villages. The locals largely rely on agriculture for income but tourism has become increasingly popular due to the relatively straightforward trek to the summit of the central crater.

Global Geoparks Network
On 20 September 2012 UNESCO made Mount Batur Caldera a part of the Global Geoparks Network.

Sedimentation
Heavy sedimentation in Mount Batur Caldera decreases the water in the lake. A plan was devised to restrict locations around the lake for tourist accommodations, to inform residents of the problems of fish farm cages in the lake, and perhaps to dredge some of the natural sedimentation from volcanic ash. 

The lake is subject to water pollution from fishing and agricultural run off, promoting the growth of too many water hyacinths, further worsening conditions in the lake, causing some to wonder if the lake will disappear between heavy sedimentation at the bottom and a dense cover of water hyacinths.

See also 

 List of volcanoes in Indonesia

References

External links
 
 

Geoparks in Indonesia
Calderas of Indonesia
Subduction volcanoes
Volcanoes of Bali
Volcanic crater lakes
Active volcanoes of Indonesia
Bangli Regency
VEI-7 volcanoes